The Punishment of Offences Act 1837 (7 Will 4 & 1 Vict c 91) was an Act of the Parliament of the United Kingdom of Great Britain and Ireland. It abolished the death penalty for a number of statutory offences and replaced it with transportation for life.

This Act originally extended to the United Kingdom (which then included the whole of Ireland).

This Act was retained for the Republic of Ireland by section 2(2)(a) of, and Part 4 of Schedule 1 to, the Statute Law Revision Act 2007.

This Act was repealed as to New Zealand by section 412(1) of, and the Fourth Schedule to, the Crimes Act 1961.

Preamble
The preamble specified the following offences:
offences under sections 1 and 4 and 5 of the Riot Act
offences under section 9 of the Murder Act 1751
offences under section 10 of the Prisoners (Rescue) Act (Ireland) 1791
offences under section 1 of the Incitement to Mutiny Act 1797
offences under section 1 of the Incitement to Disaffection Act (Ireland) 1797
offences under section 1 and 4 of the Unlawful Oaths Act 1812
offences under section 9 of the Slave Trade Act 1824

Section 1
Immediately before its repeal in England and Wales this section read:

The words "after the commencement of this Act" in the first place were repealed by the Statute Law Revision (No. 2) Act 1890. The words "at the discretion of the court" and "or for any Term not less than fifteen years, or to be imprisoned for any term not exceeding three years" in the second and third places were repealed by the Statute Law Revision Act 1892.

So far as it related to offences under the Riot Act, the Murder Act 1751 and section 4 of the Unlawful Oaths Act 1812, this section was repealed by section 10(2) of, and Part III of Schedule 3 to the Criminal Law Act 1967.

It was repealed for Northern Ireland by section 15 of, and Schedule 2 to, the Criminal Law Act (Northern Ireland) 1967.

The penalty was reduced to penal servitude for life by section 2 of the Penal Servitude Act 1857, and to imprisonment for life by section 1(1) of the Criminal Justice Act 1948, of the Criminal Justice (Scotland) Act 1949, and of the Criminal Justice Act (Northern Ireland) 1953. Section 1(1) of the 1949 Act was replaced by section 221(1) of the Criminal Procedure (Scotland) Act 1975.

Section 2 - Offences punishable by imprisonment
This section was repealed by the Statute Law Revision (No. 2) Act 1893.

Section 3 - Not to affect Powers of 5 & 6 W 4 c 38 and 4 G 4 c 64
This section was repealed by the Statute Law Revision (No. 2) Act 1890.

Section 4 - Repeal of 2 Jac 1 c 31
This section was repealed by the Statute Law Revision Act 1874.

Section 5 - Commencement of Act
This section was repealed by the Statute Law Revision Act 1874.

References
Halsbury's Statutes,
David M Walker. A Legal History of Scotland. Butterworths LexisNexis. 2001. Volume 6 (The Nineteenth Century). Pages 380, 407 and 459.

External links
The Punishment of Offences Act, as amended, from the National Archives
The Punishment of Offences Act, as originally enacted, from the National Archives (HTML)

United Kingdom Acts of Parliament 1837
Capital punishment in the United Kingdom